The synchronous grid of Continental Europe (also known as Continental Synchronous Area; formerly known as the UCTE grid) is the largest synchronous electrical grid (by connected power) in the world. The transmission system operators operating this grid formed the Union for the Coordination of Transmission of Electricity (UCTE), now part of the European Network of Transmission System Operators for Electricity (ENTSO-E).

Area

The synchronous grid of Continental Europe covers territory of the ENTSO-E Continental Europe regional group and some neighboring countries not involved in the ENTSO-E. The synchronous grid includes part or all of Austria, Belgium, Bosnia and Herzegovina, Bulgaria, Croatia, Czech Republic, Denmark (western part), France, Germany, Greece, Hungary, Italy, Luxembourg, Montenegro, the Netherlands, North Macedonia, Poland, Portugal, Romania, Serbia, Slovakia, Slovenia, Spain, and Switzerland as a members of the ENTSO-E Continental Europe regional group. In addition to the ENTSO-E members, the small west electricity island of Ukraine is synchronized with the grid of Continental Europe. Albania is operating the national grid synchronously with the synchronous grid of Continental Europe. The grids of Morocco, Algeria and Tunisia are synchronised with the European grid through the Gibraltar AC link and form the SWMB. In April 2015, the grid of Turkey was synchronized with the European grid.

Although synchronous, some countries operate in a near island mode, with low connectivity to other countries. The European Commission considers high connectivity to be beneficial, and has listed several interconnection projects as Projects of Common Interest. However, the national grids must also be upgraded to handle increased power flows if the values of a free energy market are to be realised in the EU.

On 16 March 2022, during the 2022 Russian invasion of Ukraine, the ENTSO-E set up synchronisation with the networks of Ukraine and Moldova on an emergency basis to provide external support for the power supply in those countries. Power exchange and integration gradually increased, and by August 2022, 400—700 MW were sent from Ukraine to Eastern parts of EU.

List of electricity interconnection levels

Electricity interconnection as percentage (EIL = electricity interconnection level) of installed electricity production capacity in 2014; the EU goal of at least 10% for 2020, and 15% for 2030.

Alternative formulas for calculating interconnection levels are based on peak load instead of installed capacity. 

Some border transmissions, particularly around the Alps, have both high utilization rate and high price difference, implying that further transmission would be beneficial.

Interconnections

The British grid is not synchronized with the Continental Europe frequency, but it is interconnected using high-voltage direct current (HVDC) via the HVDC Cross-Channel, BritNed, Nemo Link, IFA-2, ElecLink and North Sea Link links. In 2014, before Nemo Link, IFA-2, ElecLink and North Sea Link became operational, the United Kingdom's electricity interconnection level was 6%.

The networks of Ireland and Northern Ireland form the ENTSO-E Irish regional group, which is not yet interconnected with the Continental Europe grid, but has DC interconnections with the British network through the HVDC Moyle Interconnector and the East–West Interconnector.

Similarly, the Nordic regional group of ENTSO-E (former NORDEL), composed of Norway, Sweden, Finland and the eastern part of Denmark (Zealand with islands and Bornholm), is not synchronized with the Continental Europe, but has a number of non-synchronous DC connections with the Continental Europe grid. Gotland is not synchronized with the Swedish mainland, as it is connected by HVDC.

The network of ENTSO-E Baltic regional group, composed of Lithuania, Latvia and Estonia, currently part of the IPS/UPS system, is interconnected with the Nordic grid at an electricity interconnection level of 10% through the HVDC Estlink cables and NordBalt cable, which is functioning since 2015. The Baltics are also connected with the Continental Europe grid through the Lithuania–Poland interconnection.

The networks of Iceland and Cyprus are not yet interconnected with the other grids. Malta is connected up to 35% via the Malta-Sicily interconnector, commissioned in 2015.

Future extension plans
UCTE/ENTSO-E is planning the following extensions:
 UCTE–Ukraine/Moldova, to disconnect only these networks from the IPS/UPS system and synchronously interconnect them to the synchronous grid of Central Europe
 Tunisia–Libya synchronous connection, that would synchronise the Continental Europe with Libya, Egypt, Jordan, Syria and Lebanon (the latter five countries constitute the SEMB of the Mediterranean Electricity Ring project).

HVDC planned projects:
 The EuroAsia Interconnector between Greece, Cyprus, and Israel via the world's longest submarine power cable.

Separately, there is another option concerning Ukraine and Moldova, and the ENTSO-E Baltic regional group: to disconnect only these networks from the IPS/UPS system and synchronously interconnect them to the synchronized grid of Central Europe. In early 2021 Ukraine announced that it will be disconnecting from Russia and Belarus by the end of 2023 and integrating into the European grid. On 16 March 2022, during the Russian invasion of Ukraine, the connection to the European grid was done on an emergency basis.

Further possibilities are extension to the Nordic regional group, the Turkey-Iraq interconnection, and the DESERTEC concept for interconnection with other countries in the Middle East. In the past the Armenia and Turkmenistan networks were part of the Soviet unified system, but currently they are connected to the Iran grid.

See also

 SuperSmart Grid – proposal for a wide area synchronous grid combining European, IPS/UPS and Middle East networks
 Super grid
 European super grid
 Synchronous grid of Northern Europe

References

External links
 ENTSO-E website

Electric power transmission systems in Europe
Electric power in the European Union
Continental Europe